Idhayam Thiraiarangam is a 2012 Tamil language romantic drama film directed by Ramki Ramakrishnan, starring Anand and Swetha in the lead roles. The film had a below average box office run.

Cast
 Anand as Kumar
 Shwetha Bandekar as Mahalakshmi
 Kavitha as Appu 
 Kadhal Sukumar
 Bala Singh
 Manobala
 Vinod Sagar

Release and reception 
The film released on 1 June 2012 alongside Thadaiyara Thaakka, Mayanginen Thayanginen and Manam Kothi Paravai.

Malini Mannath of The New Indian Express wrote that "Idhayam... offers nothing novel or exciting for the viewers". A critic from Sify opined that "If you decide to see the film, go armed with loads of patience. For its dim-witted writing and sloppy direction, Idhayam Thiraiarangam is ultimately a tiresome watch". A critic from Behindwoods stated that "The list of what Idhayam Thiraiarangam needs could just be endless. Starting from a script overhaul to the casting decisions to the director’s method of storytelling, there are many things that needed to be fixed".

References

2012 films
2010s Tamil-language films